Krun is the westernmost of the "Brass Knuckles", a series of equatorial dark regions on Pluto. It is named after Krun, the greatest of the five Mandaean lords of the underworld.

Description
Krun is the third largest equatorial dark region on Pluto, after the Cthulhu Macula and the Balrog Macula. It extends nearly to 180 degrees longitude, the Plutonian longitude opposite Charon.

In popular culture
Pluto, one of three protagonists from the visual novel Heaven Will Be Mine, pilots a large mecha named the after the dark region.

References

Regions of Pluto